Saturday Matters with Sue Lawley was a short lived, late night chat show presented by Sue Lawley, which aired on BBC One in late 1989.  Originally intended as a breakout show for Lawley, who up until that point was best known as a BBC news presenter, although she had already proven her ability as a chat show host through being a regular stand-in for Terry Wogan in his own show Wogan.

Saturday Matters departed from the format of traditional, light entertainment-oriented contemporary talk shows of the period such as Aspel and Company, Parkinson and the aforementioned Wogan, in that it invited the guests to also discuss topics of current affairs as well as their own lives. The very first guest was the then Duchess of York, Sarah Ferguson. Two days after the show aired, Ferguson revealed she was pregnant with her second child and the show and Lawley were criticised for not having discovered this as part of the interview. Lawley's fawning interview with Cliff Richard was also heavily criticised.

The show was axed after one series, following poor ratings.

BBC Television shows
BBC television talk shows
1989 British television series debuts
1989 British television series endings